Velta Line (28 August 1923 – 31 December 2012) was a Latvian actress, who worked in the Latvian National Theatre since 1945.

She was married to actor and film director Gunārs Cilinskis in 1957 until his death in 1992. They had a son named Aigars, who was born 24 May 1958.

Līne died on 31 December 2012 at the age of 89, due to illness.

Selected filmography
1947 - Victorious Return
1956 - A Lesson in History as Ilsa Lange
1962 - Introduction to Life
1973 - Oļegs un Aina as Oleg's mother
1973 - Agony as Alexandra Feodorovna
1980 - Ilgais ceļš kāpās as Maiga

Awards

Stalin Prize (1948) – For the role of Kaiva Arvīda in "Māls un porcelāns"
 People's Artist of the Latvian SSR (1964)
 People's Artist of the USSR (1973)
 Order of the Red Banner of Labor (1983)
 Order of the Three Stars (2008)

References

External links

Film Museum Profile 

1923 births
2012 deaths
Actors from Riga
Communist Party of Latvia politicians
Members of the Supreme Soviet of the Latvian Soviet Socialist Republic, 1951–1955
Members of the Supreme Soviet of the Latvian Soviet Socialist Republic, 1955–1959
Ninth convocation members of the Supreme Soviet of the Soviet Union
Tenth convocation members of the Supreme Soviet of the Soviet Union
Latvian stage actresses
Soviet stage actresses
20th-century Latvian actresses
People's Artists of the USSR
People's Artists of the Latvian Soviet Socialist Republic
Stalin Prize winners
Recipients of the Order of the Red Banner of Labour
Recipients of the Order of the Three Stars